Immaculate High School is a private, Roman Catholic high school in Danbury, Connecticut, United States.  Overseen by the Diocese of Bridgeport, IHS serves residents of 23 towns in the greater Danbury area. Immaculate High School, established in 1962, enrolls 400 to 500 male and female students.  As of 2021, the school offers 16 different Advanced Placement (AP) courses with 132 students enrolled in at least one AP or equivalent course. Additional demographics that help define the student body identify 13% as non-Catholic, 2% as Eastern Orthodox and 85% Catholic. Student ethnicity includes 6.9% Hispanic; 11% Asian and Multi-Racial; and 3% African American. Roughly 10% of the student body are international exchange. The international student exchange program at Immaculate works with students from various countries such as China, Brazil, France, Germany, Lebanon and South Korea.

Athletics 
The Mustang athletic program belongs to the South West Conference and competes in class "S" in most sports. 
There are 12 varsity sports for men and 13 varsity sports for women.

The school's campus features the "Mustang Valley" multiuse field.  This turf field, installed in 2006, is used for football, lacrosse, track, soccer, field hockey and physical education class when weather permits. A new track is also available. The school facility houses a 950-seat gymnasium, a weight room, and a designated wrestling area.

The school has won 24 state championships since the school opened its doors in 1962.

Connecticut State Champions:
Men's Basketball 1976, 2012, 2016
Women's Soccer (Class "S") 1995, 2003-2006, 2008-2012 (tied in 2006 and 2009) (Class "L") 2014
Men's Soccer (Class "S") 1996, 1997 (tied in 1997)
Men's Ice Hockey (DII) 1986, 2007
Men's Baseball (Class "S") 2001, 2003, 2004
Football (Class "S") 1986 
Women's Cross Country 1997, 2013
Women's Lacrosse (Class "S") 2009
Women’s Field Hockey (Class “S”) 2018
Southwestern Connecticut Conference Champions:
Men's Ice Hockey 2000, 2003, 2007
Men's Basketball 1997, 2012
Women's Soccer 1995, 2004, 2005
Women's Indoor Track 2012
Women's Cross Country 2011

Southern Connecticut Conference Champions:
Men's Ice Hockey 2014, 2016
Women’s Field Hockey 2017, 2019, 2020

Notable alumni 

 Abby Elliott - actress
 Chris Palmer - NFL coach
 Neil Cavuto - TV commentator
 Ian K. Smith - TV personality and physician
 Ralph Scozzafava - CEO of Dean Foods
 Daniel Rocco, Emmy Award winner for Outstanding Trans-Media Sports Coverage - Rio Olympics 2016 - NBC Sports, Emmy Award winner Outstanding Interactive Experience - Event Coverage - Tokyo Olympics 2021 - NBC Sports

Notes and references

External links
 
 Roman Catholic Diocese of Bridgeport

Buildings and structures in Danbury, Connecticut
Education in Danbury, Connecticut
Catholic secondary schools in Connecticut
Schools in Fairfield County, Connecticut
Roman Catholic Diocese of Bridgeport
Educational institutions established in 1962
1962 establishments in Connecticut